Charles Hentz (born March 17, 1948) is an American former professional basketball player.

A 6'5" forward from Arkansas AM&N College, Hentz was the 6th pick in the 5th round of the 1969 NBA Draft (63rd overall pick), selected by the San Diego Rockets, but he signed with the Pittsburgh Condors of the American Basketball Association. He appeared in 57 games during the 1970–71 ABA season, averaging 6.0 points per game and 6.8 rebounds per game. He was nicknamed "The Helicopter" for his jumping and dunking abilities.

Hentz is best remembered for his actions in a November 6, 1970 game against the Carolina Cougars in Raleigh, North Carolina. Late in the first half of the game, Hentz went up for a dunk and tore the rim from his team's backboard, destroying the glass backboard in the process. The game was delayed for about an hour until the rim and backboard were replaced with a wooden backboard. With 1:07 left in the game (and the Cougars assured of victory with a 122–107 lead), Hentz destroyed another glass backboard (the one on the other end of the court) while dunking – and since there were no other replacements available, the coaches and referees agreed to end the game. According to teammate Charlie Williams, "the Helicopter just stood there smiling."

A starter early in the season, Hentz was later consigned to the Pittsburgh bench. After signing ex-Boston Celtics forward Rich Johnson, the Condors waived Hentz on February 27, 1971. He never played pro ball again.

Notes

1948 births
Living people
American men's basketball players
Arkansas–Pine Bluff Golden Lions men's basketball players
Pittsburgh Condors players
Place of birth missing (living people)
Power forwards (basketball)
San Diego Rockets draft picks